Alexis William Ernest Philip of Hesse-Philippsthal-Barchfeld (13 September 1829 in Burgsteinfurt – 16 August 1905 in Herleshausen) was the last ruling Landgrave of Hesse-Philippsthal-Barchfeld.

Life 
Alexis was a son of the Landgrave Charles of Hesse-Philippsthal-Barchfeld (1784-1854) from his second marriage to Sophie (1794-1873), the daughter of Louis William Geldricus Ernest, Prince of Bentheim and Steinfurt. He succeeded his father in 1854 as Landgrave of Hesse-Philippsthal-Barchfeld.

Alexis was a Prussian General of the Cavalry à la suite. From 1866, he was a member of the Prussian House of Lords and a Knight of the Prussian Order of the Black Eagle.

Prussia annexed the Electorate of Hesse, including Hesse-Philippsthal-Barchfeld, in 1866. They were also given three castles: the City Castle in Hanau, Rotenburg Castle and Schönfeld Castle in Kassel.

On 17 June 1854, Alexis married at Charlottenburg Palace to Louise (1829-1901), the daughter of Prince Charles of Prussia. The marriage remained childless and ended with a divorce on 6 March 1861.

Alexis died on 16 August 1905. He was succeeded as titular Landgrave of Hesse-Philippsthal-Barchfeld by his nephew Chlodwig (1876-1954), the son of his brother William (1831-1890).

Ancestors

References 
 Preußisches Jahrbuch. Dritter Jahrgang, Berlin 1863, S. 191

Landgraves of Hesse
Members of the Prussian House of Lords
House of Hesse
1829 births
1905 deaths
19th-century German people